Michael. J. Zigmond is an American neuroscientist. He is emeritus Professor of Neurology at University of Pittsburgh since 2017, previously Professor of Neurology, Psychiatry, and Pharmacology, and Editor-in-Chief of Elsevier's Progress in Neurobiology. He is an Elected Fellow, since 2009, of the American Association for the Advancement of Science. His interests include neuroprotection and neuroplasticity, health aging, and Parkinson's disease. Since 2011, he has also served as Distinguished International Professor at Fudan University.

Education
He earned his B.S. in chemical engineering at Carnegie-Mellon University and Ph.D. in biopsychology at University of Chicago in 1968.

Selected publications

References

Year of birth missing (living people)
Living people
Fellows of the American Association for the Advancement of Science
University of Pittsburgh faculty
American neurologists
University of Chicago alumni
21st-century American psychologists
20th-century American psychologists